Yannick Souvré (born 19 September 1969) is a French former basketball player who competed in the 2000 Summer Olympics. She was born in Toulouse. She was inducted into the French Basketball Hall of Fame, in 2011. She was awarded with the Glory of Sport in 2013.

References

1969 births
Living people
Sportspeople from Toulouse
French women's basketball players
Olympic basketball players of France
Basketball players at the 2000 Summer Olympics